Ehsan Khajeh-Amiri (born October 29, 1984) is an Iranian pop music singer. He is the son of Persian traditional music singer Iraj. He sang Iran national football team's official song for the 2014 FIFA World Cup.
He has a son named Arshan, born in March 2013.

Discography

Studio albums
Mano Baba ("Me and Father"), 2001
Baraye Avalin Bar ("For the First Time"), 2005
Salame Akhar ("The Last Greeting"), 2007
Fasle Tazeh ("New Season"), 2009
Ye Khatereh Az Farda ("A Memory from Tomorrow"), 2010
Asheghaneha ("The Amorous"), 2012
Paeiz, Tanhaei ("Autumn, Loneliness"), 2015
30 Salegi ("Thirties"), 2016
Shahre Divooneh ("Crazy city"), 2019

Singles

Vaghti Mikhandi ("When you laugh"), 2018
Aramesh ("Calm"), 2018
Gerdaab ("Whirlpool"), 2018
Ashegh Ke Beshi ("When be lover"), 2017
Ba Toam ("I'm with you"), 2016
Darde Amigh ("Deep pain"), 2016
 Sanie ("Second") 2015
 Boghz ("Spite") 2015
 Darvazeh Haye Donya ("The gates of the world"), 2014
 Taavaan ("Punishment), 2014
 Taghdir ("destiny"), 2014
 Baraye Akharin Bar ("For the last time")
 Miveye Mamnoue ("The Forbidden Fruit")
 Pouleh Kasif ("Dirty money")
 Majnoun-e-Leili (the song of Majnoun-e Leili movie)
 Abre Mosafer ("Passenger cloud")
 Aghebate Eshgh ("The sequel of love")
 Ashegham Man ("I'm in love")
 Azade Azadam ("I'm free")
 Emshab Shabe Mahtabe ("Moon is Shining Tonight")
 Mesle Hichkas ("Like no one")
 Be Dadam Beres ("Help me")
 Shabe Sorme
 Daste Khali
 Labkhand Payani
 Mosaferkhoone
 Divoone Hali

References

External links

 
 
 
 Ehsan Khajeh-Amiri on Spotify

1984 births
Living people
Iranian musicians
Iranian composers
People from Tehran
Singers from Tehran
Iranian pop singers
Iranian male singers
Musicians from Tehran
Iranian pop musicians
Iranian music arrangers
Persian-language singers
Iranian singer-songwriters
Iranian film score composers
Islamic Azad University alumni
21st-century Iranian male singers